Susan 'Sue' Felicity Himmelweit (born 8 August 1948), is a British economist, emeritus professor of economics for the Open University in the UK, and was the 2009 president of the International Association for Feminist Economics (IAFFE).

Career
Other bodies which Himmelweit is connected to include: principal investigator on an Economic and Social Research Council (ESRC) funded research project entitled, Gender and intra-household entitlements – a cross-national longitudinal analysis (GenIX); member of an international network on care policy called Political and Social Economy of Care in a Globalising World (PASEC), funded by Nordic Centre of Excellence's REASSESS scheme looking at the Nordic economic and social model; member of the management committee for the Women's Budget Group; member of the editorial board of Feminist Economics; and member of the editorial board of the Journal of Women, Politics & Policy.

Education
Himmelweit attended Cambridge University where she gained a doctorate in economics.

Politics
In August 2015, Himmelweit endorsed Jeremy Corbyn's campaign in the Labour Party leadership election.

Selected bibliography

Books
 
 
 
 
 
 
 
Reviewed by

Book chapters

Journal articles

Economic discussion papers
 
 
 
 
 
   See also Pierre Bourdieu and Robert Axelrod.

See also
 Feminist economics
 List of feminist economists

References

External links
 Profile page: Susan Himmelweit Open University

1948 births
Alumni of the University of Cambridge
British economists
British women economists
Feminist economists
Living people
Presidents of the International Association for Feminist Economics